Cromdale railway station served the village of Cromdale, Highland, in Scotland.

History

The station was opened by the Strathspey Railway (GNoSR) on 1 July 1863. It was absorbed by the Great North of Scotland Railway. Then station passed on to the London and North Eastern Railway during the Grouping of 1923. Passing to the Scottish Region of British Railways on nationalisation in 1948.

The station was host to a LNER camping coach from 1935 to 1939 and possibly one for some of 1934. A camping coach was also positioned here by the Scottish Region from 1954 to 1955.

The station is on the route of the Speyside Way long-distance path and has been restored as a private dwelling with an external appearance close to that of the original Great North of Scotland design. A restored carriage body built at the Inverurie works in 1916 stands behind the platform.

A private 1.5 mile railway line ran from the station yard to Balmenach Distillery, opening in 1897 and closing in 1968. It also closed from 1941 to 1947 when the distillery re-opened following expansion. The Barclay 'pug' locomotive 'Balmenach' which worked the line is now preserved at Boat of Garten on the Strathspey Railway.

The station closed to passengers on 18 October 1965 but the line was still open to freight until 4 November 1968.

References

Sources 
 Atterbury, Paul (2009). All Change! Basingstoke : AA Publishing. .
 
 Jackson, Richard (2006). The Speyside Line. Pub. privately. .

Further reading

External links 

Balmenach Distillery
 Station on navigable O.S. map

Disused railway stations in Highland (council area)
Railway stations in Great Britain opened in 1863
Railway stations in Great Britain closed in 1965
Beeching closures in Scotland
Former Great North of Scotland Railway stations